German submarine U-13 was a Type IIB U-boat of Nazi Germany's Kriegsmarine which was commissioned on 30 November 1936, following construction at the Deutsche Werke shipyards at Kiel. The first commander on board was Hans-Gerrit von Stockhausen. In her career she completed nine patrols, all while serving with the 1st U-boat Flotilla. The U-boat succeeded in sinking nine ships and damaging three more.

Design
German Type IIB submarines were enlarged versions of the original Type IIs. U-13 had a displacement of  when at the surface and  while submerged. She had two shafts and two  propellers.

U-13 was fitted with three  torpedo tubes at the bow, five torpedoes or up to twelve Type A torpedo mines, and a  anti-aircraft gun. The boat had a complement of twentyfive.

Fate
There were no casualties.

Summary of raiding history

References

Bibliography

External links

German Type II submarines
U-boats commissioned in 1935
U-boats sunk in 1940
World War II submarines of Germany
Maritime incidents in May 1940
World War II shipwrecks in the North Sea
U-boats sunk by British warships
U-boats sunk by depth charges
1935 ships
Ships built in Kiel